Dual specificity protein kinase CLK2 is an enzyme that in humans is encoded by the CLK2 gene.

Function 

This gene encodes a member of the CLK family of dual specificity protein kinases. CLK family members have shown to interact with, and phosphorylate, serine/arginine-rich (SR) proteins of the spliceosomal complex, which is a part of the regulatory mechanism that enables the SR proteins to control RNA splicing. This protein kinase is involved in the regulation of several cellular processes and may serve as a link between cell cycle progression, apoptosis, and telomere length regulation.

References

External links

Further reading